Baljci is a village in the municipality of Tomislavgrad, Canton 10 of the Federation of Bosnia and Herzegovina, an entity of Bosnia and Herzegovina. The village belongs to the local community of Šujica. Until 1945, the village was administratively part of the Srez of Livno.

The village was populated by mostly ethnic Serbs with a Croat minority. The main economic activity was husbandry. After World War II, the population declined due to economic emigration. Most of the villagers left the area before the outbreak of the Bosnian War in 1992 and in April that year, the village became uninhabited after Croat forces arrested the remaining Serbs and murdered two civilians. In 2015, two Serb former residents returned to the village.

History 

Baljci village was populated mainly by ethnic Serbs, with a Croat minority. The Serb population included the Cvjetić, Mišković, Velimir and Ćevap families. The Croat families were named Križanac, Marković, Krstanović and Nevistić. Until 1945, the village was administratively part of the Kotar (subdivision) of Livno. It belonged to the local community seated in Šujica, which also used to be part of Livno.

During World War II, the local Serb population generally did not endure major persecution due to their good standing with Croats from Šujica. In June 1941, some Baljci residents were arrested and tortured by the Ustaše. The same year, three residents were shot dead in individual shootings by the Ustaše or the occupying Italian forces. Baljci was among the first Serb-majority villages in the region between Livno and Tomislavgrad to join the Yugoslav Partisans. Thirteen Serb residents of Baljci were killed as Partisans, five Croats were killed as members of the Ustaše, three as members of the Croatian Home Guard—seven of whom were killed during the Bleiburg repatriations of 1945. In total, 20 Serb and two Croat civilians were killed during the war. After the war, Baljci was among nine villages of the Municipality of Duvno without the basic organization of the local League of Communists of Yugoslavia; farmers seldom joined the Communist Party.

After World War II, the population started to leave the village for economic reasons. In mid-1945, preparations for the colonisation of Vojvodina started. Twenty-one Serb villagers left for Tovariševo and one for Obrovac in the Municipality of Bačka Palanka. The Croat Krstanović and Nevistić families left the village for economic emigration between 1955 and 1960. According to the 1991 census, there were forty Serbs and three Croats in the village. Most of the population nad left the village before the outbreak of the Bosnian War in 1992, including the Croat Križanac family, an elderly couple. Only seven Serbs remained in the village.

After the Battle of Kupres in April 1992, retreating Croat forces entered Baljci, arrested four Serb men and murdered two elderly women. The remaining male civilian escaped but died while retreating towards Serb-held Kupres. All remaining buildings in the village were burnt. According to the 2013 census, the village was uninhabited.

In 2015, two Serb former residents returned to Baljci to work as cattlemen. They were welcomed by the municipal and cantonal officials, as well as the local Serbian Orthodox Church.

In Baljci, there are 33 stećci, monumental medieval tombstones. In one of the Eastern Orthodox cemeteries there are several old crosses with no inscription; according to a local tradition, the graves belong to the Bujas family, who arrived in Baljci from Baljci, Bileća in eastern Herzegovina. Another Eastern Orthodox cemetery has several carved wooden crosses.

Geography 

Baljci is located on the slopes of the mountain Ljubuša, south of the Kupres polje and north of the Šujica polje. The village is located oa barren mountainside that serves as pasture. Due to the high altitude, the winters are long. The nearby mountain Želivodić is covered with forest. The village had two hamlets, Cvetići and Velimiri, distanced from

Economy 

The main economic activity in the village used to be husbandry and dairy farming; milk products were mostly sold on the Dalmatian coast. There is one sheep farm, reported in 2021. One of the widespread economic activities was also foresting in the nearby Želivodić mountain.

In January 2020, the Government of the Federation of Bosnia and Herzegovina gave preliminary approval to four local companies to be issued energy permits for the construction of a wind farm in the Municipality of Tomislavgrad, including Baljci. The Ministry of Energy, Mining and Industry of the Federation of Bosnia and Herzegovina issued a draft permit for the wind farm in September 2020. The Baljci wind farm will have a capacity of 48 MW and its annual energy production is projected to be 145.7 GWh. The investor in the wind farm is a Tomislavgrad-based company Tomkup.

Demographics

Footnotes

Bibliography

Books

Journals

News articles 

 
 
 
 

Populated places in Tomislavgrad